Igor Sergeyevich Brikun (born September 6, 1986) is a Belarusian ice hockey goaltender for Yunost Minsk. Internationally he has played for the Belarusian national team. He participated at the 2015 IIHF World Championship. His older brother, Kirill Brikun, is also a hockey player. Previously he played for HK Gomel, HK Neman Grodno, and Saryarka Karagandy, a Kazakh team that played in the Supreme Hockey League (VHL).

References

External links
 

1986 births
HK Gomel players
HK Neman Grodno players
Living people
Belarusian ice hockey goaltenders
People from Navapolatsk
Saryarka Karagandy players
Yunost Minsk players
Sportspeople from Vitebsk Region